Huttunen is a Finnish surname, most prevalent in Northern Savonia. Notable people with the surname include:

Pekka Huttunen (1871–1932), Finnish tenant farmer and politician
Heikki Huttunen (1880–1947), Finnish sport shooter
Evert Huttunen (1884–1924), Finnish journalist and politician
Erkki Huttunen (1901–1956), Finnish architect
Olli Huttunen (biathlete) (1915–1940), Finnish military patrol skier 
Eevi Huttunen (1922–2015), Finnish speed skater
Jussi Huttunen (born 1941), Finnish physician, professor and scientist
Olli Huttunen (born 1960), Finnish football goalkeeper and manager
Hanna Huttunen (born 1969), Finnish politician
Toni Huttunen (born 1973), Finnish footballer
Miika Huttunen, Finnish video game critic
Jari Huttunen (born 1994), Finnish rally driver

Finnish-language surnames
Surnames of Finnish origin